Love Without End is a 1970 Hong Kong film directed by Pan Lei. It is a remake of the 1961 film of the same name.

Cast
 Jenny Hu
 Ling Yun
 Essie Lin Chia
 Wong Chung Shun
 Lui Hung
 Liu Wai
 Ho Wan Tai
 Law Hon
 Poon Oi Lun
 Lee Ho
 Chai Lam
 Cheung Chok Chow
 Chu Gam
 Ding Fung
 Fong Yue
 Fong Yuen
 Gam Gwan
 Kong Lung
 Kuo Yi
 Kwok Poi
 Lin Chih Yung
 Ling Siu
 Liu Kei
 Mang Ga
 Yee Kwan

See also
 8th Golden Horse Awards

External links
 IMDb entry
 HKMDB entry
 HK Cinemagic entry

1970 films
Shaw Brothers Studio films